Minha formação (My Formation or My Education) is the autobiography of Joaquim Nabuco, a Brazilian writer, diplomat and abolitionist. First published in 1900, it is often cited as a classic of Brazilian literature.

The autobiography includes an account of the slave-holding society in 19th-century Brazil and of the author's travels in Europe and America, as well as extensive digressions on philosophy, politics and abolitionism. It describes his encounters with Pope Leo XIII, George Sand and Ernest Renan.

References
Araújo, Ricardo Benzaquen de. Através do espelho: subjetividade em Minha formação, de Joaquim Nabuco. (Through the Mirror: Subjectivity in My Formation by Joaquim Nabuco) Revista Brasileira de Ciências Sociais, October 2004, vol.19, no.56, p. 5-13. ISSN 0102-6909 (Abstract in English)
Moriconi, Italo. Um estadista sensitivo. A noção de formação e o papel do literário em Minha formação, de Joaquim Nabuco. (A sensitive statesman. The notion of the intellectual formation and the literary role in the book, My Formation by Joaquim Nabuco) Revista Brasileira de Ciências Sociais, June 2001, vol.16, no.46, p. 161-172. ISSN 0102-6909. (Abstract in English)

External links
 Minha formação, the book

1900 non-fiction books
Brazilian biographies
Literary autobiographies
Political autobiographies
Portuguese-language works